Tihomir "Tiko" Jelisavčić (Serbian Cyrillic: Тихомир Тико Јелисавчић; 1929 – 29 June 1986) was a Yugoslavian football coach.

Biography
He managed the Australia national soccer team and Nigeria national football team during his career. During his time as Nigeria's coach he was referred to as "Father Tiko".

He presided over the Australian national team in their first ever FIFA World Cup qualifying games in 1965. Australia lost 6–1 and 3–1 in the First round.

He led Nigeria to two third-place finishes in the Africa Cup of Nations tournament in 1976 and 1978.

He was unveiled as technical director/coach of Pioneros de Cancún on 22 June 1984, a position he held until he died in a car crash on 29 June 1985.

As a player, Jelisavčić played for Partizan Belgrade in 1953/54 season.  He scored his only official goal for the club in his sole league appearance, against Proleter Osijek (3-2 win), and added one game in the Yugoslav Cup (quarterfinals against Dinamo).  Tiko was part of the Partizan squad which participated in the famous South American tour of winter 1953/54.

He won the Yugoslav Cup in 1955 with BSK Belgrade.

References

1929 births
1986 deaths
Association football forwards
Yugoslav footballers
Yugoslav football managers
FK Partizan players
FK Sloboda Užice players
OFK Beograd players
SSC Yugal players
Nigeria national football team managers
Australia national soccer team managers
1976 African Cup of Nations managers
1978 African Cup of Nations managers
Road incident deaths in Mexico
Serbian football managers
Serbian expatriate football managers